Come Around is a song by Australian band Mental As Anything, released in May 1980. as the only single from the group second album, Espresso Bongo. The song peaked at number 18 on the Kent Music Report Singles Chart. The song was written by their lead singer and guitarist, Martin Plaza.

Track listing

Personnel 
 Martin Plaza — lead vocals, guitar    
 Greedy Smith — lead vocals, keyboards, harmonica
 Reg Mombassa — guitar, vocals  
 Peter O'Doherty — bass, guitar, vocals 
 Wayne de Lisle – drums

Charts

Weekly charts

Year-end charts

References 

Mental As Anything songs
1980 songs
1980 singles
Regular Records singles
Songs written by Martin Plaza